"The Snow Women" is a sword and sorcery novella by American writer Fritz Leiber, recounting the early history of Fafhrd, a future member of the adventurous duo Fafhrd and the Gray Mouser. It was nominated for the Hugo and Nebula Awards in 1971 (although Leiber withdrew it in favor of "Ill Met in Lankhmar"), and finished second in the annual Locus poll for short fiction.

First published in 1970 in Fantastic magazine, it's in the nature of a prequel, as Leiber had by that time been chronicling the pair's adventures for thirty years. The story forms part two of the collection Swords and Deviltry.

Plot summary
Fafhrd is an eighteen-year-old member of the Snow Clan, son of Mor and Nalgron. They live within the plains of the Cold Waste. However, once every year, Fafhrd's tribe journey into Cold Corner, the southernmost region of their land, where they trade with merchants from the south and attend the Show.

Fafhrd, although betrothed to Mara, meets Vlana Lefay, an actress with the Show and is besotted by her. Despite the demands and curses from his mother, alongside her coven, he leaves the Cold Waste to travel with Vlana and see the southern kingdoms for himself.

References

External links 
 

1970 short stories
Fantasy short stories
American novellas
Short stories by Fritz Leiber
Nehwon
Works originally published in Fantastic (magazine)